The Men's individual pursuit at the 2011 UCI Track Cycling World Championships was held on March 24. Twenty-two athletes participated in the contest. After the qualification, the two fastest riders advanced to the final and the 3rd- and 4th-fastest riders raced for the bronze medal.

Results

Qualifying
The Qualifying was held at 13:00.

Finals
The final was held at 21:30.

See also
2011 UCI Para-cycling Track World Championships – Men's individual pursuit

References

2011 UCI Track Cycling World Championships
UCI Track Cycling World Championships – Men's individual pursuit